Jack S. Margolis is a counterculture writer. He is known for his pro-marijuana book A Child's Garden of Grass, which he developed into a comedy album in the 1970s with Jere Alan Brian and producer Ron Jacobs. Margolis also worked as a screenwriter and wrote the script for Claudio Guzmán's 1975 film Linda Lovelace for President. Prior to that, Margolis wrote the Jay Ward Productions film, The Nut House!!.

Bibliography

Books
A Child's Garden of Grass: The Official Handbook For Marijuana Users (1970, with Richard Clorfene) 
Cooking For Orgies & Other Large Parties (1972)  
The Ins & Outs Of Orgies (1973)
The Poetry of Richard Milhouse Nixon (1974)
Impotence is always having to say you're sorry, and other questionable insights  (1975)
Jack S. Margolis' Complete book of recreational drugs (1978)

Scripts
The Nut House!! (1964) 
Linda Lovelace for President (1975)

Discography
A Child's Garden of Grass: A Pre-Legalization Comedy (with Jere Alan Brian and Ron Jacobs) 1971 Elektra Records

Filmography
I Love You, Alice B. Toklas! (1968, as Big Bear)
Knock Outs (1992)
Roots of Evil (1992, Ralph)
Death Dancers (1993, as Ruben)

See also
 Watermark Inc.

References

External links

Living people
American male writers
Year of birth missing (living people)